There are three similarly named parties in Australia which have been known as the Motorists Party:

 the Motorists Party (Queensland), known as "Civil Liberties, Consumer Rights, No-Tolls" until March 2020
 the national Australian Motoring Enthusiast Party
 the former Australian Motorist Party, based in the Australian Capital Territory